Brian Baker may refer to:

 Brian Baker (musician) (born 1965), American guitarist for punk bands Minor Threat, Dag Nasty, and Bad Religion, among others
 Brian Baker (actor) (born 1967), American actor and former Sprint spokesman
 Brian Baker (tennis) (born 1985), American professional tennis player
 Brian Baker (The Wire), police officer on the HBO drama The Wire
 Brian Baker (politician), American politician and Missouri State Representative
 Brian Baker (producer), American engineer and producer for bands including Blue October
 Brian Baker, Australian singer for The Makers and others
 Brian Baker (runner) (born 1970), American track and field athlete and coach
 Brian Edmund Baker (1896–1979), British World War I flying ace
 Brian Baker (American football), American football coach and former player

See also
 Bryan Baker (disambiguation)